Haverhill  is a city in Essex County, Massachusetts, United States. Haverhill is located 35 miles north of Boston on the New Hampshire border and about 17 miles from the Atlantic Ocean. The population was 67,787 at the 2020 United States Census.

Located on the Merrimack River, Haverhill began as a farming community of Puritans, largely from Newbury Plantation.  The land was officially purchased from the Pentuckets on November 15, 1642 (One year after incorporation) for three pounds, and ten shillings. Pentucket was renamed Haverhill (after the Ward family's hometown in England) and evolved into an important industrial center, beginning with sawmills and gristmills run by water power.  In the 18th and 19th century, Haverhill developed woolen mills, tanneries, shipping and shipbuilding. The town was home to a significant shoe-making industry for many decades. By the end of 1913, one tenth of the shoes produced in the United States were made in Haverhill, and because of this the town was known during the time as the "Queen Slipper City".

History 

Haverhill has played a role in nearly every era of American history, from the initial colonial settlement, to the French and Indian Wars,  and the American Revolutionary and Civil Wars.

17th century  
Settlers such as John Ward, Robert Clements, Tristram Coffin, Hugh Sheratt, William White, and Thomas Davis aided in the purchase of Pentuckett. The land was sold by Passaquo and Saggahew who claimed to have permission from Passaconaway, though nothing more is known of these two figures in the historical record and it is not clear whether they were at liberty to sell the land, or indeed whether they had a shared understanding of what such a contract would entail.

Settlers Thomas Hale, Henry Palmer, Thomas Davis, James Davis and William White were Pentuckett's first selectmen. First Court appointments given to end small causes were given to Robert Clements, Henry Palmer, and Thomas Hale. At the same court, it was John Osgood and Thomas Hale that were also appointed to lay the way from Haverhill to Andover. It is said that these early settlers worshipped under a large oak tree, known as the "Worshipping Oak". 

The town was renamed for the town of Haverhill, England, in deference to the birthplace of the settlement's first pastor, Rev. John Ward. The original Haverhill settlement was located around the corner of Water Street and Mill Street, near the Linwood Cemetery and Burying Ground. The home of the city's father, William White, still stands, although it was expanded and renovated in the 17th and 18th centuries. White's Corner (Merrimack Street and Main Street) was named for his family, as was the White Fund at Boston's Museum of Fine Arts.

Judge Nathaniel Saltonstall was chosen to preside over the Salem witch trials in the 17th century; however, he found the trials objectionable and recused himself. Historians cite his reluctance to participate in the trials as one of the reasons that the witch hysteria did not take as deep a root in Haverhill as it did in the neighboring town of Andover, which had among the most victims of the trials. However, a number of women from Haverhill were accused of witchcraft, and a few were found "guilty" by the Court of Oyer and Terminer.

One of the initial group of settlers, Tristram Coffin, ran an inn. However, he grew disenchanted with the town's stance against his strong ales, and in 1659 left Haverhill to become one of the founders of the settlement at Nantucket.

Haverhill was for many years a frontier town, and was occasionally subjected to Indian raids, which were sometimes accompanied by French colonial troops from New France, in which dozens of civilians were murdered.  During King William's War, Hannah Dustin became famous for killing and then scalping her native captors, who were converts to Catholicism, after being captured in the Raid on Haverhill (1697). The city has the distinction of featuring the first statue erected in honor of a woman in the United States. In the late 19th century, it was Woolen Mill Tycoon Ezekiel J. M. Hale that commissioned a statue in her memory in Grand Army Republic Park. The statue depicts Dustin brandishing an axe. Her captivity narrative and subsequent escape and revenge upon her captors caught the attention of Cotton Mather, who wrote about her, and she also received from the colonial leaders a reward per Indian scalp. In recent years some have criticized Hannah Dustin since the Native American Indians she killed and scalped in order to escape were allegedly not her original captors and among the people she killed were young children. Hannah, born Hannah Emerson, is often maligned for coming from a troubled family: in 1676 her father Michael Emerson was fined for excessive violence toward his 12-year-old daughter Elizabeth, who in 1693 was hanged for concealing the deaths of her illegitimate twin daughters; and in 1683 Hannah's sister Mary was whipped for fornication. There were never any allegations of any sort against Hannah herself.

18th century 
In 1708, during Queen Anne's War, the town, then about thirty homes, was raided by a party of French, Algonquin and Abenaki Indians. Like most towns, Haverhill has been struck by several epidemics. Diphtheria killed 256 children in Haverhill between November 17, 1735, and December 31, 1737.

George Washington visited Haverhill on November 4, 1789. Washington was on a "triumphant circuit" touring New England.

19th century 

The Bradford Academy was established in 1803. It began as a co-educational institution, then became women-only in 1836.

In 1826, an influenza struck. A temperance society was formed in 1828.

Haverhill residents were early advocates for the abolition of slavery, and the city still retains a number of houses which served as stops on the Underground Railroad. In 1834, a branch of the American Anti-Slavery Society was organized in the city. In 1841, citizens from Haverhill petitioned Congress for dissolution of the Union, on the grounds that Northern resources were being used to maintain slavery. John Quincy Adams presented the Haverhill Petition on January 24, 1842. Even though Adams moved that the petition be answered in the negative, an attempt was made to censure him for even presenting the petition. In addition, poet and outspoken abolitionist John Greenleaf Whittier was from Haverhill.

The Haverhill and Boston Stage Coach company operated from 1818 to 1837 when the railroad was extended to Haverhill from Andover. It then changed its name and routes to the Northern and Eastern Stage company.

It was Ezekiel Hale Jr. and son Ezekiel James Madison Hale (descendants of Thomas Hale) that gave Haverhill a great head of steam. It was in the summer of 1835, the brick factory on Winter St was erected by Ezekiel Hale Jr. and Son. It was intended to run woolen flannel at a whopping six hundred yards of flannel per day. It was Ezekiel JM Hale, age 21 and graduate of Dartmouth College that came to the rescue when fire destroyed the operation in 1845. He rebuilt the mill at Hale's Falls, now more than twice as large produced nearly three times the output. Ezekiel JM Hale became Haverhill's Tycoon. EJM Hale served a term in the State Senate and was much revered in the area. Hale donated large sums of money to build the hospital and library.

Haverhill was incorporated as a city in 1870.

Firefighting efforts were hampered by not only the primitive fire fighting equipment of the period, but also high winds and freezing temperatures. The nearby water source—the Merrimack River—was frozen, and hoses dropped through the ice tended to freeze as well. A New York Times report the next day established the damage at 300 businesses destroyed and damage worth approximately $2M (in 1882 dollars).

Annexation

Bradford fits naturally into Haverhill but they were separate towns until January 1, 1897, when Bradford joined the City of Haverhill. Bradford was originally the western part of Rowley until it split from Old Rowley in 1672. In 1850, the East part of Bradford left and was founded as the independent town of Groveland. When Haverhill became a city in 1870, there were calls for the town to be annexed. This would go on for another 26 years.  Neither town agreed to a plan, until in late 1896, the vote came up and both sides agree to join.

There were many reasons for the decision.  Finances played a part into the annexation; a lot of people who lived in Bradford had businesses in Haverhill and wanted lower taxes. Traditionalists wanted Haverhill to be a dry town as Bradford was. Businesses in Lawrence, Portsmouth, and Andover wanted Haverhill to be a dry town so more business would show up and increase businesses in those towns. The demand for municipal services like hospitals, schools, and a new factory downtown were in Haverhill while Bradford had none of the three. The Bradford Center of town wanted to join Haverhill but the Ward Hill section of town did not at the time since it was a substantial distance from both Bradford and Haverhill.

Finally, another reason why Haverhill wanted to annex Bradford was to return the town to majority English instead of the plurality of Irish, French Canadians and Central Europeans (Hungarians, Slovaks, Germans, and Italians) it had become with the influx of mill workers. Haverhill gladly approved with the first ballot in 1870 and Bradford was no more starting January 1, 1897. Bradford remains the only town in the Commonwealth of Massachusetts to be annexed to a neighboring city other than Boston.

Haverhill became the first American city with a socialist mayor in 1898 when it elected former shoe factory worker and cooperative grocery store clerk John C. Chase. Chase was re-elected to this position in 1899 but was defeated the following year.

20th century 
Haverhill was the site of a riot in 1915 as well as the eponymous Haverhill fever, also known as rat-bite fever, in 1926.

In the early part of the 20th century, the manufacturing base in the city came under pressure as a result of lower priced imports from abroad. The Great Depression exacerbated the economic slump, and as a result city leaders enthusiastically embraced the concept of urban renewal in the 1950s and 1960s, receiving considerable federal funds used to demolish much of the north side of Merrimack Street, most of the Federal homes along Water Street (dating from the city's first hundred years of development), and throughout downtown. Many of the city's iconic buildings were lost, including the Oddfellows Hall, the Old City Hall, the Second Meetinghouse, the Pentucket Club, and the Old Library, among others.

In 1932, French residents erected a statue of Marquis de Lafayette which still stands today in the aptly named intersection called Lafayette Square.

During Urban Renewal, the iconic high school—the inspiration for Bob Montana's Archie Comics—was declared "unsound" and slated for demolition. Instead, the historic City Hall on Main Street was demolished, and city began using the High School of Archie's Gang as the new City Hall.

Urban Renewal was controversial.  Several leading citizens argued to use the funds for preservation rather than demolition. Their plan was not accepted in Haverhill, which chose to demolish much of its historic downtown, including entire swaths of Merrimack Street, River Street, and Main Street. However, examples of the city's architecture, spanning nearly four centuries, abound: from early colonial houses (the White residence, the Dustin House, the 1704 John Ward House, the 1691 Kimball Tavern, and the historic district of Rocks Village) to the modernist 1960s architecture of the downtown Haverhill Bank. The city's Highlands district, adjacent to downtown, is a fine example of the variety of Victorian mansions built during Haverhill's boom years as a shoe manufacturing city.

21st century 
Throughout the 21st century, Haverhill has undergone a substantial renaissance of many sorts. Housing trends, combined with a rezoning by the city led by longtime Mayor James Fiorentini and the use of Federal and State brownfield's money to clean up abandoned factories, resulted in the conversion of several abandoned factories in downtown into loft apartments and condominiums. There has been a total of $150 million in public and private investment in the old factory district area. Additionally, the Washington Street area gained new dining and entertainment spots, with federal, state and local funds contributing to removing an abandoned gas station on Granite Street. The site was cleaned up and converted into a 350-space parking garage. The city was also able to obtain federal, state and local money to put in a new boardwalk and boat docks in the downtown area aside the Merrimack River.

In recent years, the city completed a rezoning of downtown proposed by Mayor Fiorentini designed to encourage artist loft live work space and educational uses for the downtown area. Despite the city's efforts, old buildings remain vacant or underutilized, such as the former Woolworth department store, which has been boarded up for over 40 years at the intersection of Main Street and Merrimack Street. The building was eventually purchased, with plans put into place to renovate and repurpose the site; however, this never actually happened. On March 19, 2015, the Woolworth building was demolished to make way for a $68 million development.

In 2018, it was announced that the mayor's administration was successful in acquiring $13 million in state funding to go towards increasing pedestrian safety on North Avenue.

Timeline 

 1640 - European settlers arrive.
 1645
 Town of Haverhill incorporated.
 First Parish Church founded.
 1679 - Town becomes part of Essex County.
 1697 - Hannah Duston captured during King William's War.
 1708 - Town raided during Queen Anne's War.
 1735 - Diphtheria epidemic.
 1789 - George Washington visits town.
 1790 - Population: 2,408.
 1796 - Haverhill Social Library organized.
 1803 - Bradford Academy founded.
 1812 - Haverhill Musical Society organized.
 1814 - Merrimack Bank incorporated.
 1818 - Haverhill and Boston Stage Coach in operation.
 1821 - Haverhill Gazette begins publication.
 1826 - Influenza outbreak.
 1835 - Farrington & Chace shoe manufactory in business.
 1837 - Andover and Haverhill Railroad begins operating.
 1840 - Population: 4,336.
 1850 - Population: 5,877.
 1851 - Macy's dry good shop in business.
 1852 - Haverhill Athenaeum established.
 1853 - Smiley & Sons machinery dealer in business.
 1859 - Haverhill Library Association established.
 1868
 Primrose Street Schoolhouse built.
 Herman F. Morse & Co. picture store in business.
 1869 - Morse & Son's Circulating Library in business.
 1870 - City of Haverhill incorporated.
 1871 - Haverhill Hat Company incorporated.
 1873 - Fire.
 1875 - Winnekenni Castle (residence) built.
 1877 - Jennings & Spaulding and E.H. Emerson & Co. shoe manufactories in business.
 1878 - Haverhill Furniture Exchange in business.
 1880 - Population: 18,472.
 1882 - February - Fire.
 1883 - Merrimac Bridge constructed.
 1885
 Bon Ton Bazar opens.
 Pentucket Wheel Club organized.
 1889
 City Hall rebuilt.
 Intervale Factory built.
 1890 - John C. Tilton Elementary School was built.
 1895 - Peabody School built.
 1897 - Town of Bradford becomes part of Haverhill.
 1898
 John C. Chase (socialist) becomes mayor.
 Haverhill Historical Society incorporated.
 1900 - Population: 37,175.
 1901 - St. Michael the Archangel Parish founded.
 1906 - Board of Trade Building constructed.
 1916 - Rotary Club established.
 1947 - WHAV radio begins broadcasting.
 1961 - Northern Essex Community College opens.
 1972 - Whittier Regional Vocational Technical High School established.
 1988 -  Haverhill Community Television incorporated.
 1989 - Mason & Hamlin piano manufactory relocates to Haverhill.
 1997 - John F. Tierney becomes U.S. representative for Massachusetts's 6th congressional district.
 1998 - Pentucket Lake School Opens
 2003
 City website online.
 James J. Fiorentini elected mayor.  Mayor Fiorentini is the longest-serving mayor in Haverhill's history, which has had Mayors since 1870.
 2007 - Niki Tsongas becomes U.S. representative for Massachusetts's 5th congressional district.
 2008
 Spotlight Playhouse founded.
 Zion Bible College relocates to Haverhill.
 2010 - Population: 60,879.

Geography 
The city ranks 60th in the Commonwealth in terms of land area, and is the largest city or town in Essex County. Haverhill is drained by the Little and Merrimack rivers, the latter separating the Bradford section of town from the rest of Haverhill. The highest point in the city is found on Ayers Hill, a drumlin with two knobs of almost equal elevation of at least , according to the most recent (2011-2012) USGS 7.5-minute topographical map. The city also has several ponds and lakes, as well as three golf courses.

Haverhill is bordered by Merrimac to the northeast, West Newbury and Groveland to the east, Boxford and a small portion of North Andover to the south, Methuen to the southwest, and Salem, Atkinson and Plaistow, New Hampshire, to the north.

Climate

Geology
The overall terrain within Haverhill is heavily influenced by various glacial formations. With drumlins, moraines, eskars, glacial erratics, and kettle ponds being common. Gravel mining operations are conducted along eskars and glacial deposites of readily accessible gravel.

Much of the soil within Haverhill is consolidated glacial till; inceptisols with moderate pedological development being the most common, as well as spodidols seen within the coniferous forests local to the area. Various fluvial deposits can be seen surrounding the river banks of the Merrimack and its tributaries.

The river systems within Haverhill have also been heavily altered by glacial activity, with drainage patterns being inconsistent and variable. Because of this inconsistency, and examples of each drainage pattern in some capacity being observable, streams and rivers within Haverhill would be classified as having a deranged drainage pattern.

Within close proximity of the Clinton-Newbury fault line, the bedrock topography of Haverhill is part of the Berwick Formation, consisting of metasandstone quartzite and sulfuric mica schists dating from the Silurian period. However other metamorphic rocks such as gneiss and shale are relatively common. Granite, feldspars, and other igneous silicates are also abundant.

Points of interest 
 Main Street Historic District
 Museum of Printing
 Winnekenni Park Conservation Area, including Winnekenni Castle and Lake Saltonstall

Demographics 

As of the census of 2010, there were 60,879 people, 25,576 households, and 14,865 families residing in the city. The racial makeup of the city was 88.3% White, 4.5% African American, 0.3% Native American, 1.6% Asian, 0.03% Pacific Islander, 4.30% from other races, and 2.6% from two or more races. Hispanic or Latino made up 14.5% of the population (5.8% Puerto Rican, 4.6% Dominican, 0.9% Mexican, 0.5% Guatemalan, 0.3% Salvadoran, 0.3% Colombian, 0.2% Cuban). 16.8% were of Irish, 14.6% Italian, 10.1% French, 9.0% English, 7.8% French Canadian and 6.3% American ancestry according to Census 2000.

There were 22,976 households, out of which 33.0% had children under the age of 18 living with them, 47.0% were married couples living together, 13.4% had a female householder with no husband present, and 35.3% were non-families. 28.6% of all households were made up of individuals, and 10.3% had someone living alone who was 65 years of age or older. The average household size was 2.51 and the average family size was 3.11.

In the city, the population was spread out, with 25.7% under the age of 18, 7.7% from 18 to 24, 33.5% from 25 to 44, 20.4% from 45 to 64, and 12.8% who were 65 years of age or older. The median age was 36 years. For every 100 females, there were 90.3 males. For every 100 females age 18 and over, there were 85.7 males.

The median income for a household in the city was $49,833, and the median income for a family was $59,772. Males had a median income of $41,197 versus $31,779 for females. The per capita income for the city was $23,280. About 7.0% of families and 9.1% of the population were below the poverty line, including 12.3% of those under age 18 and 10.0% of those age 65 or over.

Crime

In 2019, Haverhill's violent crime rate per 100,000 inhabitants was higher than the average rate of violent crime in both the state of Massachusetts and the nation as a whole. The rate of violent crime in Haverhill has declined in the past several years, however, from a recent peak of 391 in 2017 to a low of 304 in 2020.

Government
City government

Haverhill operates under a Mayor-council form of government. The current mayor is James J.  Fiorentini, who has been mayor of Haverhill since 2004 and was most recently re elected in 2021. The City Council has nine members, elected every two years. The most recent election was during 2021.

State representation

Haverhill is represented in the state legislature by officials elected from the following districts:
 Massachusetts Senate's 1st Essex district.
 Massachusetts House of Representatives' 2nd Essex district
 Massachusetts House of Representatives' 3rd Essex district
 Massachusetts House of Representatives' 14th Essex district
 Massachusetts House of Representatives' 15th Essex district

Education 
Haverhill is the home of the main campus of Northern Essex Community College. Until its closing in 2000, Bradford College provided liberal arts higher education in Haverhill. In 2007, it became the new home of the Zion Bible College, now called Northpoint Bible College. The University of Massachusetts Lowell has a satellite campus in Haverhill in the Harbor Place building, and also offers several courses at Northern Essex Community College. Haverhill completed the reconstruction of the Hunking middle school in the Bradford part of the city. Haverhill is also home to the historic Walnut Square School, first built in 1898 at a cost of $30,000. The school's tower clock was created by Mr. Edward Howard, a famous clock maker of the 1890s, at a cost of $1,300.

Public schools in the city are operated by the Haverhill Public Schools District.

In late October 2022, there was a strike initiated by Haverhill teachers as part of the local teacher's union, the Haverhill Education Association (HEA). The purpose of this strike was to renegotiate teacher contracts as well as future salary increases to adjust for inflation. A lower average pay for the district in comparison to the overall state average lead to years of tension between the union and Haverhill school committee, eventually culminating in the strike. Schools closed for four days as negotiations proceeded between union representatives and members of the school committee. The strike ended after an agreement was met between both parties. Both the strike and the eventual agreement met were overwhelmingly supported by HEA members during internal votes within the union; with over 600 members supporting the strike and 25 against it, and 99% of the union supporting the eventual negotiated agreement.

Infrastructure

Transportation
Haverhill lies along Interstate 495, which has five exits throughout the city. The town is crossed by five state routes, including Routes 97, 108, 110, 113 and 125. Routes 108 and 125 both have their northern termini at the New Hampshire state border, where both continue as New Hampshire state routes. Four of the five state routes, except Route 108, share at least a portion of their roadways in the town with each other. Haverhill is the site of six road crossings and a rail crossing of the Merrimack; two by I-495 (the first leading into Methuen), the Comeau Bridge (Railroad Avenue, which leads to the Bradford MBTA station), the Haverhill/Reading Line Railroad Bridge, the Basiliere Bridge (Rte. 125/Bridge St.), the Bates Bridge (Rtes. 97/113 to Groveland), and the Rocks Village Bridge, to West Newbury, just south of the Merrimac town line. The project is expected to take two to three years and cost approximately $45 million.

MBTA Commuter Rail provides service from Boston's North Station with the Haverhill and Bradford stations on its Haverhill/Reading Line. Amtrak provides service to Portland, Maine, and Boston's North Station from the same Haverhill station. Additionally, MVRTA provides local bus service to Haverhill and beyond. The nearest small-craft airport, Lawrence Municipal Airport, is in North Andover. The nearest major airport is Manchester-Boston Regional Airport in Manchester, and the nearest international airport is Logan International Airport in Boston.

Notable people

 John Mapes Adams, Medal of Honor recipient during the Boxer Rebellion
 Mabel Albertson (1901–1982), actress
 Louis Alter (1902–1980), songwriter ("Do You Know What It Means to Miss New Orleans?")
 Daniel Appleton (1785–1849), publisher
 William Henry Appleton (1814–1899), Daniel Appleton's son, publisher of Lewis Carroll, Arthur Conan Doyle, Charles Darwin, Thomas Henry Huxley, Herbert Spencer, and John Stuart Mill
 Bailey Bartlett (1750–1830), member of the United States Constitutional Convention
 Alexander Graham Bell (1847–1922), inventor, spent considerable time in Haverhill initially as a tutor to the deaf son of a prominent shoe magnate who later invested in Bell's telephone concept
 John Bellairs (1938–1991), author of gothic horror fiction for children and young adults
 William Berenberg (1915–2005), Harvard University professor and pediatrician
 Tom Bergeron (born 1955), television personality, comedian, and game show host.
 Peter Breck (1929–2012), actor
 Isaac Newton Carleton (1832–1902), educator
 Walter Tenney Carleton (1867–1900), businessman
 Stuart Chase (1888–1985), economist
 Tristram Coffin, among the town's first settlers, who later left to settle Nantucket
 Russ Conway (1949–2019), investigative journalist and Elmer Ferguson Memorial Award recipient
 David Crouse, writer
 Andre Dubus III (born 1959), novelist and short story writer
 Hannah Duston (1657–1736), colonial heroine, first woman in the United States to be honored with a statue
 Frank Fontaine (1920–1978), comedian, Crazy Guggenheim on The Jackie Gleason Show
 Jeff Fraza, boxer and contestant on reality television show The Contender
 Charlotte Fullerton, author and Emmy-winning children's television writer/producer
 Jordan Harris (2000-), hockey player for the Montreal Canadiens
 Moses Hazen (1733–1803), Continental Army general
 Sylvia Hitchcock, Miss Alabama USA 1967, Miss USA 1967, Miss Universe 1967
 Red Howard (1900–1973), football player 
 Dr. Duncan MacDougall, physician whose studies inspired the film 21 Grams
 Rowland H. Macy (1822–1877), merchant
 Louis Burt Mayer (1884-1957) American film producer and co-founder of Metro-Goldwyn-Mayer studios (MGM)
 Karen McCarthy, Missouri politician
 Charles Minot (1810–1866), railroad executive at Erie Railroad
 Bob Montana, Archie Comics co-creator
 William Henry Moody (1853–1917), Supreme Court justice, and prosecutor in the Lizzie Borden trial
 Carlos Peña, Major League Baseball player
 Anthony Purpura (born 1986), USA Rugby National Team player
 Effie Alberta Read (–1930), scientist at the US Food and Drug Administration
 Stephen Robert (born 1940), former chairman and CEO of Oppenheimer & Co., former Chancellor of Brown University
 Seth Romatelli, actor, host of Uhh Yeah Dude
 James E. Rothman, notable cell biologist and Nobel Prize winner
 Joseph Ruskin (1924–2013), née Joseph Richard Schlafman, actor, had roles in four  Star Trek series and films including The Magnificent Seven and Prizzi's Honor
 Mike Ryan, Major League Baseball player
 Nathaniel Saltonstall (1639–1707), judge at the Salem witch trials
 Jon Shain (born 1967), folk musician
 Spider One, née Michael Cummings, musician, brother of Robert Cummings a.k.a. Rob Zombie
 Charles Augustus Strong (1862–1940), philosopher, of the American school of critical realism
 Noah Vonleh, professional basketball player for the Boston Celtics
 John Greenleaf Whittier (1807–1892), poet; his poem Snow-Bound is set in Haverhill
 Charlotte White (1782–1863), first unmarried American woman missionary, arrived India 1816  
 Rob Zombie (born 1965), born Robert Cummings, musician and founding member of White Zombie, film director, mainly horror genre

See also
 List of mill towns in Massachusetts

Notes

Bibliography 

 The Story of Hannah Dustin
 "The Great Fire at Haverhill" from The New York Times archive
 "Haverhill's Great Loss" from The New York Times archive
 Disaster Genealogy - The Haverhill Fire

published in 19th century
 Mirick, B L (1832). History of Haverhill. Haverhill: A W Thayer.
 
 
 
 
 
 Haverhill - Facts of Interest (1880).
 
 
 
 White, Daniel (1889).  The Descendants of William White, of Haverhill, Mass.

published in 20th century
 
 Thomas, Samuel (1904).  Whittier-land: A Handbook of North Essex.
 
 
 
 
 Arrington, Benjamin F. (1922). Municipal History of Essex County in Massachusetts. Volume 2 - Haverhill. Volume 3 Biographical. Volume 4 Biographical. New York: Lewis Historical Publishing Company.
 
 
published in 21st century
 Regan, Shawn, "Literary Haunts", Eagle-Tribune, October 22, 2006

External links 

 

 
Cities in Massachusetts
Populated places established in 1640
Massachusetts populated places on the Merrimack River
Populated places on the Underground Railroad
Cities in Essex County, Massachusetts
1640 establishments in Massachusetts